"When I See You Smile" is a song written by Diane Warren and performed by American-British glam metal band Bad English. It was released in September 1989 as the second single taken from their self-titled debut album released in 1989. The power ballad is the band's most successful song, reaching number-one in both the United States and Canada.

Music video
In the video the band are performing on a stage, which contains close-up shots of its members. The footage was taken at one of their arena concerts. It shows Jonathan Cain's distinctive synthesizer opening and moves into the soft initial vocal work of John Waite. The tempo picks up with Deen Castronovo's drum work and Neal Schon's trademark guitar during which Waite becomes more emphatic vocally; the song finishes with Waite's soft vocals. The video was directed by Jonathan Cain.

Track listings
7-inch, cassette, and mini-CD single
 "When I See You Smile" – 4:16
 "Rockin' Horse" – 5:26

12-inch and CD single
 "When I See You Smile" – 4:17
 "Tough Times Don't Last" – 4:40
 "Rockin' Horse" – 5:28

Charts

Weekly charts

Year-end charts

Certifications

References

1989 songs
1989 singles
Bad English songs
Billboard Hot 100 number-one singles
Cashbox number-one singles
Epic Records singles
Glam metal ballads
RPM Top Singles number-one singles
Song recordings produced by Richie Zito
Songs written by Diane Warren
1980s ballads